The 2021–22 Ukrainian First League U–19 Championship is the 6th season of the Ukrainian Junior Under 19 Championship in First League. The competition involved participation of several junior teams of the Professional Football League of Ukraine as well as some other football academies.

Teams
 Debut: Nika Kyiv, CS Favoryt Boryspil, FC Vorskla Poltava (2), im. Horpynka Poltava, Avanhard Lozova, Khadzhybei Usatove, Penuel Kryvyi Rih, Chornomorets Odesa (2), Zirka Kropyvnytskyi, FC Kulykiv, Halychyna Lviv, FC Uhornyky, FSC Chernivtsi
 Withdrawn: Nyva Vinnytsia, Nika Ivano-Frankivsk, Hirnyk Novoyavorivsk, Lokomotyv Kyiv, Skailark Kyiv, Bila Tserkva, Yednist Kyiv, Zoria Myronivshchyny, Metalurh Zaporizhzhia, Enerhiya Dnipro, Kobra Kharkiv, Lider Dnipro, OKKO Kharkiv

 Note: Vorskla Poltava, Chornomorets Odesa already have under-19 teams in UPL.

Group stage

Group 1

Top goalscorers

Group 2

Top goalscorers

Group 3

Top goalscorers

Group 4

Top goalscorers

Finals

Quarterfinals

Four teams tournament

Semifinals

Game for 3rd place

Finals 

Notes

See also
2021–22 Ukrainian First League
2021–22 Ukrainian Second League

References

External links
 Season's results at the Youth Football League of Ukraine
 Gold Talant, general information on all youth competitions in Ukraine

First League
Junior Championship First League
Sports events affected by the 2022 Russian invasion of Ukraine